Riverbank Park is a park in the Ironbound section of Newark, Essex County, New Jersey, United States. The park was opened in 1910 and was added to the National Register of Historic Places on April 16, 1998.  It is the smallest and one of the most heavily used parks in the Essex County Park System.

History 
The park was designed by the Olmsted Brothers, the firm of Frederick Law Olmsted. The park land was acquired in 1907 and construction finished in 1910. A driving force behind the building of the park was Franklin Murphy (governor) who wanted his workers at the Murphy Varnish Works to have open space.

An expansion took place between 1926 and 1931. The baseball fields are on the former location of the Balbach Smelting & Refining Company, one of the largest metal processing companies in the country, which closed in the 1920s.

In 1996, there was an attempt to build the Newark Bears, Bears & Eagles Riverfront Stadium at the site of the park, demolishing the park. SPARK (Save the Park At RiverbanK) is a community group formed to save the park from destruction. After an unsuccessful attempt to save the park via referendum, they were able to get the park on the National Historic Register.

SPARK's work also resulted in a remediation of contaminated soil in the park, which was completed in 2003.

In August 2011, plans were announced to create Newark Riverfront Park, next door to Riverbank Park along the Passaic River which opened in August 2012. A further extension of parkland along the river was announced in June 2016. Work proceeded in 2017. Eventually it will reach Bridge Street Bridge.

Programming 
Currently, SPARK hosts programs in the park including a Learning Program with the New Jersey Historical Society and Greater Newark Conservancy, movie nights and Music and Art Day.

See also
 Jackson Street Bridge
Kearny Riverbank Park
National Register of Historic Places listings in Essex County, New Jersey

References

1907 establishments in New Jersey
Parks in Essex County, New Jersey
National Register of Historic Places in Newark, New Jersey
Geography of Newark, New Jersey
County parks in New Jersey
New Jersey Register of Historic Places